The 1979 San Jose State Spartans football team represented San Jose State University during the 1979 NCAA Division I-A football season as a member of the Pacific Coast Athletic Association. The team was led by first year head coach Jack Elway. They played home games at Spartan Stadium in San Jose, California.

The Spartans finished the 1979 season as co-champions of the PCAA, with a record of six wins, four losses and one tie (6–4–1, 4–0–1 PCAA). However, in December 1979 the PCAA ruled that the Spartans had used an ineligible player in seven of their games. As a result, the team's co-championship of the conference was vacated, and the record was adjusted to 3–8 (2–3 PCAA).

Schedule

Team players in the NFL
The following were selected in the 1980 NFL Draft.

The following finished their San Jose State career in 1979, were not drafted, but played in the NFL.

Notes

References

San Jose State
San Jose State Spartans football seasons
San Jose State Spartans football